Philippus, son of Butacides (fl. 6th century BC) was a citizen of Croton. Having married the daughter of Telys, king of the rival state of Sybaris, and being obliged in consequence to leave his country, he sailed away to Cyrene; and, when Dorieus, the Spartan prince, son of Anaxandridas II, set forth from the Libyan coast, on his Sicilian expedition, Philippus accompanied him with a galley, equipped and manned at his own expense, and was slain in Sicily in a battle between Carthaginians and Egestaeans. He was the finest man of his time, and a conqueror at Olympia; by virtue of which qualifications the Egestaeans worshipped him after his death as a hero.

See also
Greek hero cult

References
Herodotus - 5.47

Ancient Crotonian athletes
Ancient Olympic competitors
6th-century BC Greek people
Ancient Greeks killed in battle
Ancient Crotonians